IF Gnistan (The Spark in English) is a Finnish football club from the city of Helsinki, founded in 1924. The club is currently playing in the Ykkönen, the second tier of the Finnish league system. IF Gnistan play their home matches at Mustapekka Areena. Club's home district is Oulunkylä, which locates in northern part of the capital city.

The club is originally Swedish-speaking, but nowadays it is supported by Finnish-speaking majority also. The club was founded by a few Svenska Reallyceum and Åggelby Svenska Samskola students from Oulunkylä in 1924. IF Gnistan were multi-sport club and had several competitive departments including ski, athletics, swim and pesäpallo (Finnish baseball). Football department were founded in 1935, when the club joined Finnish Football Association Helsinki district. Later in the 1950s Gnistan had strong teams in orienteering, women's gymnastics, table tennis and cross country running alongside the classical sports.

During the late 1950s, the club decided to dissolve all the other departments except for the football teams. When ski and athletics were eliminated, Gnistan turned to a football club, and named Jacob Söderman as their new chairman. They became a significant team in lower leagues of the capital region but never promoted to the top tier. After season 1994, they achieved their place to Ykkönen for the first time. They stayed in the second tier four years and then relegated back to Kakkonen in 1998. They have been in Ykkönen level three occasions.

Background
Gnistan has played seven seasons in the Ykkönen (First Division), the second tier of Finnish football in 1995–98, 2001–02 and from the season 2017. The club has played fourteen seasons in the Kakkonen (Second Division), the third tier of Finnish football in 1990, 1994, 1999–2000 and 2003–2016.

In 2002, the club nearly made it to the semi-finals of the Finnish Cup, by leading FC Lahti 2–0 till the 90th minute. A FC Lahti fan, ran naked to the field, which caused 5 minutes of added time. Lahti scored twice in injury time and in extra time they made the final score 2–3.

After season 2016, the club won their Kakkonen group and achieved a chance to qualify for Ykkönen for the next season. They faced another group winner Musan Salama on two-legged tie, which started away from home in Pori. Both meetings ended 1–0 victories for the home teams, so the promoting team were solved by penalty shoot-out. Gnistan beat their opponents by 4–3 and promoted to the second tier of Finnish football after spending 14 seasons in a row in Kakkonen.

Season to season

9 seasons in Ykkönen
44 seasons in Kakkonen
10 seasons in Kolmonen
9 seasons in Nelonen
2 seasons in Vitonen

Club Structure
Gnistan run a number of teams including 4 men's teams, 3 veteran's teams, 2 ladies teams, 11 boys team and 6 girls teams.  The club also runs a Football School for youngsters.

2010 season
IF Gnistan are competing in Group A (Lohko A) of the Kakkonen administered by the Football Association of Finland  (Suomen Palloliitto) .  This is the third highest tier in the Finnish football system.  In 2009 Gnistan finished in second position in their Kakkonen section.

Gnistan / 2 are participating in Section 1 (Lohko 1) of the Nelonen (Fourth Division) administered by the Helsinki SPL.

Gnistan / Ogeli are participating in Section 2 (Lohko 2) of the Nelonen (Fourth Division) administered by the Helsinki SPL.

Gnistan / Roots are participating in Section 2 (Lohko 2) of the Kutonen (Sixth Division) administered by the Helsinki SPL. In 2009 Roots finished in second position in Section 2 Seiska (Seventh Division).

Current squad

References

Sources
 Suomen Cup

External links
Official Website
 IF Gnistan Facebook

Football clubs in Helsinki
1924 establishments in Finland